Monte Alto (Portuguese for "High Hill") is a municipality in the state of São Paulo in Brazil founded on May 15, 1881. The population is 50,772 (2020 est.) in an area of 347 km². The elevation is 735 m. Its motto is (from Latin) Mons Altus Semper Altius (High Hill Always Higher). The sanctuary and mausoleum to the Brazilian popular saint, Menina Izildinha, is located in the city.

References

Municipalities in São Paulo (state)